Carlotta Zofkova Costa de Saint-Genix de Beauregard (born 22 February 1993) is an Italian backstroke swimmer. She represented her country at the 2016 Summer Olympics.

References

1993 births
Living people
Italian female backstroke swimmers
Swimmers at the 2016 Summer Olympics
Olympic swimmers of Italy
Universiade medalists in swimming
European Aquatics Championships medalists in swimming
Universiade gold medalists for Italy
Swimmers of Centro Sportivo Carabinieri
Medalists at the 2015 Summer Universiade
Medalists at the 2017 Summer Universiade
Mediterranean Games medalists in swimming
Mediterranean Games gold medalists for Italy
Mediterranean Games silver medalists for Italy
20th-century Italian women
21st-century Italian women
Swimmers at the 2022 Mediterranean Games